The Car of Chance is a 1917 American silent drama film directed by William Worthington and starring Franklyn Farnum, Agnes Vernon and Helen Wright.

Cast
 Franklyn Farnum as Arnold Baird
 Agnes Vernon as Ruth Rennett 
 Helen Wright as Mrs. Bennett
 Molly Malone as Wanda Heimstone
 Mark Fenton as James Bennett
 H.J. Bennett as William Mott Smith
 Walter Belasco as Israel Heimstone
 Harry De More as Tom Nolan

References

Bibliography
 Robert B. Connelly. The Silents: Silent Feature Films, 1910-36, Volume 40, Issue 2. December Press, 1998.

External links
 

1917 films
1917 drama films
1910s English-language films
American silent feature films
Silent American drama films
American black-and-white films
Universal Pictures films
Films directed by William Worthington
1910s American films